Singer Pur is a German vocal sextet founded in 1991 by former members of the Regensburger Domspatzen. The five original members were joined by a soprano in 1994. The sextet is focussed on classical music, but who have also performed and recorded traditional folk songs and pop music. Singer Pur have recorded more than 30 CDs. Singer Pur have given concerts and workshops in nearly 60 countries all over the world.

Members

Recent members 
 Claudia Reinhard – soprano 
 Christian Meister – tenor
 Markus Zapp – tenor
 Manuel Warwitz – tenor
 Jakob Steiner – baritone
 Felix Meybier - bass

Former members 
 Caroline Wegmann – soprano
 Hedwig Westhoff-Düppmann – soprano
 Ulrike Hofbauer – soprano
 Claus Werner – tenor
 Christian Wegmann – tenor
 Guido Heidloff – baritone
 Andreas Hirtreiter – tenor
 Thomas E. Bauer – baritone
 Klaus Wenk – tenor
 Rüdiger Ballhorn – tenor
 Reiner Schneider-Waterberg – baritone
 Marcus Schmidl – bass

Discography
 1994 - Singer Pur Vokalsolistenensemble - Lassus: four works, Johnny Mercer: Emily, Ludwig Senfl, Ralph Vaughan Williams, Palestrina, Ivan Moody: The Wild Swans at Coole, György Ligeti, Guillaume Dufay, Max Reger Al Jarreau, Luca Marenzio.
 1995 - Factor Orbis Tomás Luis de Victoria, Orlando di Lasso, Josquin des Prez, Ludwig Sennfl, Cypriano de Rore Alexander Utendal, Conrad Rupsch, Jacob Obrecht, Philippe de Monte, Ranlequin de Mol, Hans Leo Haßler Jacobus Gallus, William Byrd, Gesualdo. Ars Musici
 1996 - Nordisk Vokalmusik Nordic Vocal Music - Wilhelm Stenhammar, Håkan Parkman, Nils-Erik Fougstedt, Einojuhani Rautavaara, Nils Lindberg, Heikki Sarmanto, Erna Tauro, Wilhelm Peterson-Berger, Ulf Långbacka, :sv:Maurice Karkoff, Björn Kruse, Trond Kverno, Arne Mellnäs, David Wikander, Bo Hansson, Elisabet Hermodson. Ars Musici
 1997 - Musik für Stimmen Music for Voices. Weiss and Douglas (arr. Hans Huber): What a Wonderful World, Claude Debussy Trois chansons de Charles d’Orléans John Cage, Ivan Moody, György Ligeti, Hans Leo Haßler, Jacobus Clemens non Papa, Orlando di Lasso  Ludwig Sennfl, Ninot le Petit, Cypriano de Rore, Paul Patterson, Johannes Brahms, Irish traditional The little green lane, Wilhelm Stenhammar, Friedrich Silcher, Joseph Gabriel Rheinberger, Neil Hefti. Ars Musici
 1999 - Orlando di Lasso: Tous les regrez Ars Musici
 2002 - Jacobus Gallus: Moralia Harmoniae Morales  Latin secular works 3CD (excerpts on 1CD) Ars Musici
 2003 - Ahi Vita Monteverdi, Gesualdo, Phinot and Striggio with clarinettist :de:Michael Riessler 
 2003 - Electric Seraphim Singer Pur & :de:Go Guitars. Works for choir and electric guitars Dufay, Pipelare, Venosa, Cage, Pärt, Michael Hirsch,  Bernhard Weidner and Fredrik Zeller. K&K Verlagsanstalt
 2004 - Rihm, Sciarrino, Moody, Metcalf - Wolfgang Rihm: Tenebrae factae sunt, Salvatore Sciarrino: Responsorio delle tenebre a sei voci, Ivan Moody: Lamentation of the Virgin, Joanne Metcalf. with The Hilliard Ensemble
 2005 - Herztöne - Lovesongs. Nils Lindberg, trad. Londonderry Air, Johannes Brahms, Werner R. Heymann, Erroll Garner, Evert Taube, Robert Schumann, Thomas Ravenscroft, Felix Mendelssohn-Bartholdy, Jacques Chailley, George Gershwin, Percy Grainger, Carroll Coates: "London by night," Volkslied, Burt Bacharach, Volksweise, Chick Corea, Billy Joel.
 2006 - SOS - Save Our Songs! 
 2007 - Das Hohelied der Liebe - Settings from the Song of Songs - Dominique Phinot, Ivan Moody Canticum Canticorum II (1994) Leonhard Lechner, Guillaume Dufay, Brian Elias, Jean Richafort, Heinrich Schütz, Joanne Metcalf, John Plummer, Ludwig Sennfl, Wilhelm Keller
 2008 - Memento: George de La Hèle, Wolfgang Rihm, Pärt, Lassus
 2008 - Drei Schiffe sah ich segeln nach Bethlehem! German Christmas carols for mixed choir: Hans Schanderl, Reiko Füting, Peter Wittrich, William Hawley, Wolfram Buchenberg
 2009 - Adrian Willaert: Musica Nova 1559 (Vol.I - Petrarch madrigals 2CD)
 2010 - Letztes Glück - Songs of the German Romantics: Works by Johannes Brahms, Robert Schumann, Friedrich Silcher, Franz Schubert, Richard Strauss, Max Reger and Felix Mendelssohn-Bartholdy. Oehms 
 2012 - Sting: Singer Pur sings Sting Sting a-cappella
 2010 - Jeremiah - Lamentations by Palestrina and Gesualdo with :de:David Orlowsky clarinet Sony Classics
 2011 - Renaissance am Rhein - motets, songs and chansons of the 16th century Petit Jean de Latre, Nicolaus Zangius, Andreas Pevernage, Konrad Hagius, Martin Peudargent, Johannes de Cleve, Orlando di Lasso, Johannes Mangon
 2012 - Roland de Lassus Biographie musicale vol. II (Vol.I is by another ensemble) Musique en Wallonie
 2013 - Adrian Willaert: Musica Nova 1559 (Vol.II - motets 3CD) Oehms
 2013 - Gioseffo Zarlino Modulationes sex vocum (1566) Singer Pur
 2015 - Der Singer Pur Adventskalender - 24 German Advent songs
 2016 - Gavin Bryars - The I Tatti Madrigals
 2016 - Advents- und Weihnachtszeit mit Singer Pur Advent songs and Christmas carols
 2017 - Sagenhaft! - 25 Jahre Singer Pur 
 2017 - Best of Singer Pur a double CD with 35 songs out of productions with the label OehmsClassics from the years 2003-2015
 2019 - Horizons - Der Geist weht, wo er will
 2021 - Lou Koster: Der Geiger von Echternach - a cantata for solo voices, piano, violin and vokal ensemble
 2021 - Among Whirlwinds - compositions by women for voices Frauen
 2022: Musica Divina - Göttliche Vokalmusik aus der Schatztruhe Carl Proskes
 2022: SENFL featuring Ensemble Leones

Publications
 (book) Sheets: SOS - Save Our Songs! - German folksongs edited for mixed choir, Schott Music ED 20301
 (book) Sheets: Drei Schiffe sah ich segeln nach Bethlehem - German Christmas carols edited for mixed choir, Schott Music ED 20711
 (book) Sheets: Der Singer Pur Adventskalender - 24 German Advent songs edited for mixed choir, Schott Music ED 22344

References

External links 

 
 

Early music groups
A cappella musical groups
People from Regensburg
German choirs
Oehms Classics artists